The Loyola Ramblers men's basketball team represents Loyola University Chicago in Chicago, Illinois. The Ramblers participate as members of the Atlantic 10 Conference. The Ramblers had joined the Missouri Valley Conference in 2013,  and stayed until 2022. Prior to 2013, the team had spent 34 seasons as a charter member of the Horizon League.

In 1963, Loyola won the 1963 NCAA Division I men's basketball tournament (then the "NCAA University Division") men's basketball national championship under the leadership of All-American Jerry Harkness, defeating two-time defending champion Cincinnati 60–58 in overtime in the title game. All five starters for the Ramblers played the entire championship game without substitution.

Surviving team members were honored on July 11, 2013, at the White House to commemorate the 50th anniversary of their victory. The entire team was inducted in November of that year in the College Basketball Hall of Fame. As of 2021, Loyola remains the only school from the state of Illinois to win a men's Division I basketball NCAA tournament. Loyola's first-round regional victory over Tennessee Tech on March 11, 1963, remains a record for margin of victory (69 points) for any NCAA men's basketball tournament game.

The team gained national publicity again in 2018, as a result of both their Cinderella Story-esque performance in the tournament, in which they upset numerous teams to reach the Final Four as an 11-seed, tying for the lowest seed ever to do so, and the cultural popularity of their team chaplain, the then-98-year-old nun Sister Jean.

As of February 17, 2021, the team had achieved its highest Kenpom ranking ever, at number nine in the country, with the number one ranked defense.

History

Racial integration

The Loyola University Chicago teams of the early 1960s, coached by George Ireland, are thought to be responsible for ushering in a new era of racial equality in the sport by shattering all remaining color barriers in NCAA men's basketball. Beginning in 1961, Loyola broke the longstanding gentlemen's agreement (not to play more than three black players at any given time), putting as many as four black players on the court at every game. For the 1962–63 season, Ireland played four black Loyola starters in every game. That season, Loyola also became the first team in NCAA Division I history to play an all-black lineup, doing so in a game against Wyoming on December 29, 1962. In that season's NCAA tournament, Loyola defeated the all-white team of then-segregated Mississippi State by a score of 61–51, a game especially notable because the Bulldogs defied a state court order prohibiting them from playing against a school with black players. The game has since been dubbed the "Game of Change" in popular culture.

In 1963, Loyola shocked the nation and changed college basketball forever by starting four black players in the NCAA championship game. Loyola's stunning upset of two-time defending NCAA champion Cincinnati, in overtime by a score of 60–58, was the crowning achievement in the school's nearly decade long struggle with racial inequality in men's college basketball, highlighted by the tumultuous events of that year's NCAA Tournament. Loyola's 1963 NCAA title was historic not only for the racial makeup of Loyola's team, but also due to the fact that Cincinnati had started three black players, making seven of the 10 starters in the 1963 NCAA Championship game black.

Postseason

NCAA tournament results
The Ramblers have appeared in eight NCAA tournaments. Their combined record is 15–7. They were National Champions in 1963. On March 24, 2018, the Ramblers defeated Kansas State 78–62 to advance to play in their second Final Four in school history.

NIT results
The Ramblers have appeared in five National Invitation Tournaments. They reached the championship game twice, and won the third place consolation game once. Their combined record is 6–5.

CBI results
The Ramblers have appeared in the College Basketball Invitational (CBI) once, winning it in 2015. Their record is 5–0.

Retired numbers

, eight players have had their jerseys retired by the school.

Awards
All-Americans
1929, 1930 – Charlie “Feed” Murphy
1937 – Marv Colen
1938, 1939 – Mike Novak
1938, 1939 – Wibs Kautz
1948 – Jack Kerris
1952 – Nick Kladis
1962, 1963 – Jerry Harkness
1967 – Jim Tillman
1970, 1972 – LaRue Martin
1982 – Wayne Sappleton
1985 – Alfredrick Hughes
2006 – Blake Schilb (Honorable Mention)
2018 – Clayton Custer (Honorable Mention)
2021 – Cameron Krutwig (Third Team)

Academic All-Americans
2013 – Ben Averkamp (Second Team)
2019 – Clayton Custer (Third Team)

MCC/Missouri Valley Coach of the Year
1985 – Gene Sullivan
2018 – Porter Moser

MCC/Horizon League/Missouri Valley Player of the Year
1981 – Darius Clemons
1982 – Wayne Sappleton
1983, 1984, 1985 – Alfredrick Hughes
1987 – Andre Moore
2018 – Clayton Custer
2019 – Marques Townes
2021 – Cameron Krutwig 

MCC/Horizon League/Missouri Valley First Team
1981 – Darius Clemons
1981, 1982 – Wayne Sappleton
1983, 1984, 1985 – Alfredrick Hughes
1984, 1986 – Carl Golston
1985 – Andre Battle
1986, 1987 – Andre Moore
1987 – Bernard Jackson
1988 – Gerald Hayward
1990, 1991 – Keith Gailes
1992 – Keir Rogers
1998, 1999 – Javan Goodman
2001, 2002 – 
2004 – Paul McMillan
2005, 2006, 2007 – Blake Schilb
2017 – Milton Doyle
2018 – Clayton Custer
2019 – Marques Townes
2019, 2020, 2021 – Cameron Krutwig

MCC/Horizon League/Missouri Valley Second Team
1980, 1982 – Darius Clemons
1983 – Andre Battle
1985 – Carl Golston
1985 – Andre Moore
1988 – Kenny Miller
1989 – Keith Gailes
1994 – Vernell Brent
1996, 1997 – Derek Molis
2000 – Earl Brown
2003 – David Bailey
2012, 2013 – Ben Averkamp
2018 – Donte Ingram
2021 – Lucas Williamson

Missouri Valley Conference Third Team
2017 – Donte Ingram
2018 – Cameron Krutwig
2019 – Clayton Custer
2020  – Tate Hall
2021 – Aher Uguak

MCC/Horizon League/Missouri Valley All-Defensive Team
1998, 2000 – Earl Brown
2004 – Demetrius Williams
2006, 2007 – Majak Kou
2018 – Ben Richardson
2020  – Lucas Williamson
2021 – Aher Uguak
2021 – Lucas Williamson

MCC/Horizon League/Missouri Valley Newcomer of the Year
1984 – Carl Golston
1986 – Bernard Jackson
1988 – Kenny Miller
1989 – Keith Gailes
2003 – Paul McMillan
2014 – Milton Doyle

MCC/Horizon League/Missouri Valley All-Newcomer Team
1988 – Kenny Miller
1993 – Vernell Brent
1996 – Derek Molis
1999 – Chris Williams
2003 – Paul McMillan
2003 – Demetrius Williams
2006 – Leon Young
2014 – Milton Doyle
2017 – Aundre Jackson
2018 – Cameron Krutwig
2020 – Tate Hall
2021 – Braden Norris

Missouri Valley Freshman of the Year
2014 – Milton Doyle
2018 – Cameron Krutwig

Missouri Valley All-Freshman Team
2014 – Milton Doyle
2018 – Cameron Krutwig
2018 – Lucas Williamson
2019 – Cooper Kaifes
2020 – Marquise Kennedy

Missouri Valley Sixth Man of the Year
2017 – Aundre Jackson

Missouri Valley Defensive MVP
2018 – Ben Richardson
2021 – Lucas Williamson

MCC/Horizon League/Missouri Valley Tournament MVP
1983, 1985 – Alfredrick Hughes
 2018 – Donte Ingram
2021 – Cameron Krutwig

MCC/Horizon League/Missouri Valley All-Tournament Team
1980, 1982 – Darius Clemons
1982 – Wayne Sappleton
1983, 1985 – Alfredrick Hughes
1984, 1985 – Carl Golston
1985 – Andre Battle
1986 – Carl Golston
1987 – Bernard Jackson
1987 – Andre Moore
1989, 1990, 1991 – Keith Gailes
1992 – Keir Rogers
2002 – David Bailey
2002 – Ryan Blankson
2005, 2007 – Blake Schilb
 2018 – Donte Ingram, Ben Richardson, Marques Townes
2021 – Cameron Krutwig, Braden Norris

Ramblers in the NBA draft

Ramblers players in the NBA/ABA
 Wilbert Kautz (1947)
 Mickey Rottner (1947–1948)
 Jack Dwan (1949)
 Mike Novak (1949–1950)
 Jerry Nagel (1950)
 Jack Kerris (1950–1953)
 Don Hanrahan (1953)
 Ed Earle (1954)
 Jerry Harkness (1964–1969)
 Les Hunter (1965–1973)
 LaRue Martin (1973–1976)
 Andre Wakefield (1979–1980)
 Wayne Sappleton (1985)
 Alfredrick Hughes (1986)
 Andre Moore (1988)
 Milton Doyle (2017–2018)

References

External links